The Division of Hughes is an Australian electoral division in the state of New South Wales.

History

The division was created in 1955 and is named for Billy Hughes, who was Prime Minister of Australia from 1915 to 1923. Originally a marginal Labor seat, it was taken by the Liberals in their 1966 landslide. However, the Liberal margin was redistributed away in 1968 when most of its Liberal-friendly territory was shifted to newly created Cook, and Labor won it back on a large swing. It remained in Labor hands for the next quarter-century, though it became increasingly marginal from 1984 onward.

It was one of many marginal seats taken by the Liberals in the 1996 landslide. The Liberals have held it ever since – although they came close to losing it in the 2007 Labor landslide – and it is now generally considered to be a safe Liberal seat.

The former member for Hughes between the 2010 federal election and the 2022 Australian federal election was Craig Kelly. He served as a Liberal until he resigned from the party to sit as an Independent in February 2021, before joining Clive Palmer’s United Australia Party in August 2021. In the 2022 Australian federal election, the Liberal Party of Australia won the seat back, with Jenny Ware becoming the new MP.

Boundaries
Since 1984, federal electoral division boundaries in Australia have been determined at redistributions by a redistribution committee appointed by the Australian Electoral Commission. Redistributions occur for the boundaries of divisions in a particular state, and they occur every seven years, or sooner if a state's representation entitlement changes or when divisions of a state are malapportioned.

The division is located in the southern and southwestern suburbs of Sydney, including Alfords Point, Bangor, Barden Ridge, Bonnet Bay, Bundeena, Como, Engadine, Garie Beach, Grays Point, Hammondville, Heathcote, Holsworthy, Illawong, Jannali, Kareela, Kirrawee, Loftus, Lucas Heights, Maianbar, Menai, Oyster Bay, Pleasure Point, Sandy Point, Sutherland, Voyager Point, Waterfall, Wattle Grove, Woronora, Woronora Heights, and Yarrawarrah; as well as parts of Audley, Gymea, Moorebank, Royal National Park, and Sylvania. The Liverpool Military Area—comprising Holsworthy Barracks and Steele Barracks—is also located in the electorate.

Members

Election results

References

External links
 Division of Hughes - Australian Electoral Commission

Electoral divisions of Australia
Constituencies established in 1955
1955 establishments in Australia